Oleh Anatoliovych Suslov (born 2 January 1969 in Kadiivka, Ukrainian SSR) is a former professional Ukrainian football player. He for several years played in Austria where ended his playing career. Before that for over 10 years he stayed in Odessa where he played for couple of teams. In 1993–94 Ukrainian Cup season his penalty kick brought FC Chornomorets Odesa its second national club competition award. In the final of that edition Chornomorets defeated Tavriya in the series of penalty kicks as the regular and extra time brought a dry tie between them, 0:0.

Honours
Chornomorets Odesa
 Ukrainian Cup: 1992 (substitute for Viktor Hryshko), 1994
Austria Salzburg
 Austrian Bundesliga: 1996–97

External links 
Profile on the kulichki
Profile on ukrsoccerhistory.com

1969 births
Living people
People from Stakhanov, Ukraine
Ukrainian footballers
Ukrainian expatriate footballers
Expatriate footballers in Austria
Ukrainian expatriate sportspeople in Austria
Association football goalkeepers
Ukraine international footballers
FC Chornomorets Odesa players
FC Zorya Luhansk players
SC Odesa players
FC Red Bull Salzburg players
SKN St. Pölten players
FC Admira Wacker Mödling players
Ukrainian Premier League players
Austrian Football Bundesliga players
Sportspeople from Luhansk Oblast